This is the complete list of Asian Winter Games medalists in ice hockey from 1986 to 2017.

Men

Women

References

External links
 2017 Results Book

Ice hockey
medalists